

The Alliance P.2 Seabird was a British single-engined long-range biplane designed by J.A. Peters to enter the Daily Mail £10,000 Atlantic Flight Prize. In the end it did not compete but became the first aircraft to fly from London (Acton) to Madrid non-stop on 31 July 1919.

Design and development
The  Alliance Aeroplane Company which had constructed aircraft under licence during the First World War decided to build aircraft for the civil market. The Seabird was a long-range two-seat biplane powered by a  Napier Lion piston engine. With an endurance of 21 hours it had an enclosed cabin for the crew of two and two aircraft were built.

Operational history
On 17 April 1919 Peters the designer paid the £100 entrance fee to the Royal Aero Club as entry fee for the Alliance biplane into the competition for the Daily Mail £10,000 Atlantic Flight Prize. Flown by Peters with Captain W.R. Curtis of the Royal Air Force the first Seabird (registration G-EAGL) carried out a trial flight on 31 July 1919 when it made the first direct non-stop flight between London and Madrid, 900 miles in just under eight hours. The aircraft did not in the end compete in the Atlantic competition.

The second aircraft G-EAOX was entered into an Australian Government prize of £10,000 for a flight from Great Britain to Australia.  Flown by two Australian airmen, Lieutenant Roger Douglas (pilot) and Lieutenant J.S.L. Ross (Navigator), G-EAOX left Hounslow Heath Aerodrome on 13 November 1919 but a few minutes into the flight the Seabird crashed near Surbiton killing both airmen.

The company never recovered from the accident and was closed down in 1920.

Specifications

References

Notes

Bibliography

1910s British civil utility aircraft
Single-engined tractor aircraft
Biplanes
Aircraft first flown in 1919
Aviation accidents and incidents in England